Oppy may refer to:

 the nickname of Opportunity (rover), a Mars rover that landed on the planet Mars in 2004
 a nickname for J. Robert Oppenheimer (most often spelled "Oppie"), the Manhattan Project leader
 the nickname of Hubert Opperman, Australian cyclist and politician
 Oppy, Pas-de-Calais, a commune of the Pas-de-Calais département, in northern France
 Shortened form of optimist (dinghy)
 Professor and author Graham Oppy, born 1960 in Australia